The Stage is a prominent moraine floored amphitheater (a cirque) between West Aisle Ridge and Central Aisle Ridge on the north side of Renegar Glacier, Scott Coast. The feature was visited by D. N. B. Skinner's New Zealand Geological Survey field party, 1977–78, which suggested the name; viewed from the lower Renegar Glacier the elevated floor of the amphitheater appears to be the ideal stage for some great theater.

See also
Backdrop Ridge

References
 

Cirques of Antarctica
Landforms of Victoria Land
Scott Coast